The 2016 Città di Como Challenger was a professional tennis tournament played on clay courts. It was the eleventh edition of the tournament which was part of the 2016 ATP Challenger Tour. It took place in Como, Italy between 29 August – 4 September 2016.

Singles main-draw entrants

Seeds

 1 Rankings are as of August 22, 2016.

Other entrants
The following players received wildcards into the singles main draw:
  Lorenzo Sonego
  Gianluca Mager
  Gianluigi Quinzi
  Andrea Pellegrino

The following player received entry as an alternate:
  Maximilian Marterer

The following players received entry from the qualifying draw:
  Andrea Vavassori
  Pedro Cachín
  Mikael Ymer
  Danilo Petrović

The following player received entry as a lucky loser:
  Andrea Collarini

Champions

Singles

  Kenny de Schepper def.  Marco Cecchinato,  2–6, 7–6(7–0), 7–5.

Doubles

  Roman Jebavý /  Andrej Martin def.  Nils Langer /  Gerald Melzer, 3–6, 6–1, [10–5].

External links
Official Website

Citta di Como Challenger
Città di Como Challenger
Città di Como Challenger
Città di Como Challenger
Città di Como Challenger